Xya is a genus of pygmy mole crickets, with species recorded from Africa, southern Europe, Asia and Australia.

Species
The Orthoptera Species File lists:

 Xya albiantennata Günther, 1995
 Xya albigenata Günther, 1995
 Xya albipalpis (Chopard, 1934)
 Xya ancarafantsika Günther, 1982
 Xya apicicornis (Chopard, 1928)
 Xya atra Günther, 1995
 Xya aurantipes Günther, 1995
 Xya capensis (Saussure, 1877)
 Xya castetsi (Bolívar, 1900)
 Xya crassicornis (Chopard, 1920)
 Xya curta (Chopard, 1936)
 Xya descampsi (Harz, 1971)
 Xya donskoffi (Harz, 1971)
 Xya elytromaculata Günther, 1995
 Xya festiva (Chopard, 1968)
 Xya frontomaculata (Günther, 1974)
 Xya fujianensis Cao, Chen & Yin, 2020
 Xya galla (Saussure, 1895)
 Xya harzi Günther, 1990
 Xya hauseri (Günther, 1974)
 Xya hieroglyphica (Bey-Bienko, 1967)
 Xya huxleyi (Harz, 1971)
 Xya iberica Günther, 1990
 Xya indica (Chopard, 1928)
 Xya inflata Brunner von Wattenwyl, 1893
 Xya japonica (Haan, 1844)
 Xya leshanensis Cao, Shi & Hu, 2017
 Xya leucophrys Sato & Ichikawa, 2020
 Xya londti Günther, 1982
 Xya mahakali Ingrisch, 2006
 Xya manchurei Shiraki, 1936
 Xya maraisi Günther, 1998
 Xya marmorata (Chopard, 1928)
 Xya minor (Chopard, 1920)
 Xya muta (Tindale, 1928)
 Xya nanutarrae Baehr, 1988
 Xya nigraenea (Walker, 1871)
 Xya nigripennis (Chopard, 1936)
 Xya nitobei (Shiraki, 1911)
 Xya nobile Ingrisch, 1987
 Xya opaca (Walker, 1871)
 Xya pfaendleri Harz, 1970
 Xya pronotovirgata Günther, 1995
 Xya pseudomuta Baehr, 1988
 Xya pulex (Saussure, 1896)
 Xya punctata (Bey-Bienko, 1967)
 Xya quadrimaculata (Chopard, 1936)
 Xya riparia (Saussure, 1877)
 Xya royi Günther, 1982
 Xya schoutedeni (Chopard, 1934)
 Xya shandongensis Zhang, Yin & Yin, 2018
 Xya sichuanensis Cao, Shi & Yin, 2018
 Xya smithersi (Günther, 1978)
 Xya subantarctica (Willemse, 1954)
 Xya tumbaensis Günther, 1995
 Xya uamensis Günther, 1995
 Xya unicolor Baehr, 1988
 Xya univenata Günther, 1995
 Xya variegata (Latreille, 1809)type species (as Tridactylus variegatus Latreille)
 Xya vicheti (Harz, 1971)
 Xya xishangbanna Cao, Rong & Naveed, 2020
 Xya yunnanensis Cao, Rong & Naveed, 2020

References

External links

Naturephoto-cz: Xya variegata

Tridactylidae
Orthoptera genera